Sassaman is a surname. Notable people with the surname include:

 Len Sassaman (1980–2011), computer programmer and privacy advocate
 Nathan Sassaman (born 1963), American military officer 

English-language surnames